Fredericksburg station is a passenger rail station in Fredericksburg, Virginia. It is served by Amtrak's Carolinian, Northeast Regional, and Silver Meteor trains, and the Virginia Railway Express's Fredericksburg Line. (Amtrak's Silver Star, Palmetto, and Auto Train services pass through the station without stopping.) It is located on Lafayette Boulevard (U.S. Route 1 Business). The station has two side platforms serving the two tracks of the RF&P Subdivision.

History

The Fredericksburg station was originally built in 1910 by the Richmond, Fredericksburg and Potomac Railroad, as a replacement for an older ground level station house. The RF&P arrived in Fredericksburg as far back as January 1837. A former Virginia Central Railway Depot can be found on adjacent tracks two blocks to the west on the southwest corner of Lafayette Boulevard and Charles Street. 

The RF&P's passenger service was taken over by Amtrak in 1971. and commuter service was re-introduced by Virginia Railway Express in 1992 when the station became the southern terminus of the Fredericksburg Line. Since 1997, the station house was occupied by Claiborne's restaurant, until it was replaced in 2010 by the Bavarian Chef Restaurant. The station underwent a major restoration project between 2010 and 2011.

The line was extended to a new terminus at Spotsylvania station in November 2015 with the hopes of easing the parking crunch at Fredericksburg.

In June 2017, the VRE board approved a $431,000 to repair the western sections of platform, with plans to add an additional stair tower. Further in the future, plans for the Southeast High Speed Rail Corridor call for a third track and an expanded station slightly to the east.

Bibliography

Notes

External links

 Fredericksburg Train Station – VRE
Fredericksburg Amtrak-VRE Station – USA Rail Guide (Train Web)

Transportation in Fredericksburg, Virginia
Amtrak stations in Virginia
Virginia Railway Express stations
Fredericksburg
Bus stations in Virginia
Railway stations in the United States opened in 1837
1837 establishments in Virginia